The Outsider is the twelfth studio album by American country music singer Rodney Crowell. It was released on August 16, 2005 via Columbia Records. The album includes the singles "The Obscenity Prayer" and "Say You Love Me".

Critical reception
Thom Jurek of Allmusic gave the album four stars out of five, calling it a "natural extension" of Crowell's last two albums, The Houston Kid and Fate's Right Hand. He also praised the album for "dig[ging] deep into social and political consciousness."

Track listing
All songs written by Rodney Crowell, except "Shelter from the Storm", written by Bob Dylan.

Personnel
Compiled from notes on digipak.

Musicians

Eddie Bayers – drums
Richard Bennett – guitars, fuzzbox
Pat Buchanan – guitars, harmonica, background vocals
Beth Nielsen Chapman – background vocals
J. T. Corenflos – guitars
John Cowan – background vocals
Chad Cromwell – drums
Rodney Crowell – lead and background vocals, guitars
Kim Fleming – background vocals
Steve Fischell – steel guitar
Shannon Forrest – drums
Tony Harrell – organ, keyboards
Emmylou Harris – background vocals, guitar
John Hobbs – organ, keyboards
Jim Horn – saxophone
Jedd Hughes – guitars, mandolin, background vocals
The Jenkins – background vocals
Will Kimbrough – lead guitar, background vocals
Trey Landry – drums
Billy Livsey – organ
Jerry McPherson – guitars
Buddy Miller – background vocals
Julie Miller – background vocals
John Mock – concertina, tin whistle
Greg Morrow – drums
Will Owsley – background vocals
Marcia Ramirez – background vocals
Michael Rhodes – bass guitar
Chris Rodriguez – background vocals
Vince Santoro – background vocals
Randy Scruggs – flamenco guitar
Steuart Smith – lead guitar
J.D. Souther – background vocals
Crystal Taliefero – background vocals
Randall Waller – background vocals
Jonathan Yudkin – strings, fiddle

Technical
Tracy Baskette-Fleaner – art direction, design
Peter Coleman – producer, recording, mixing
Donivan Cowart – additional recording
Rodney Crowell – producer
Brandon Epps – recording assistant
John Grady – executive producer
Deb Haus – art director
Dawn Nepp – production assistant
Thomas Petillo – photography
Jennifer Tsar – photography

Chart performance

References

2005 albums
Columbia Records albums
Rodney Crowell albums
Albums produced by Rodney Crowell